Grand Ayatollah Mirza Abd al-Hadi al-Husayni al-Shirazi  (1882 – July 13, 1962) was an Iraqi-Iranian Shia marja' and poet. After the death of Abu al-Hasan al-Esfehani, al-Shirazi was considered to be one of the highest ranking scholars in Iraq, along with Muhsin al-Hakim (possibly higher ranking than al-Hakim) and some less popular jurists like Muhammad-Husayn Kashif al-Ghitaa, Mahmoud al-Shahroudi, and Muhammad-Ridha Al Yasin. His brother-in-law, Mirza Mahdi al-Shirazi was the leading scholar in Karbala.

He was one of the leading scholars that issued an anti-communist fatwa during the rise of the "red tide" in Iraq under Abd al-Karim Qasim.

Early life and education

Early life 
He was born in 1888, in the city of Samarra to the prominent religious al-Shirazi family. His father was Mirza Ismail al-Shirazi, a mujtahid and poet, who fell ill and died a few months after his sons birth. Mirza Shirazi, the pioneer of the Tobacco Movement was married to his paternal aunt. Mirza Mahdi al-Shirazi was his brother-in-law.

Education 
He grew up and studied in Samarra, under his cousin Sayyed Agha Ali al-Shirazi (son of Mirza Shirazi; d. 1936) and his wife's maternal uncle Mirza Muhammad-Taqi al-Shirazi. He then moved to Najaf in 1908, to complete his religious education. He studied under greats such as Sheikh Fathallah al-Isfahani, Sheikh Muhammad-Kadhim al-Khorasani, Sheikh Muhammad-Hussain al-Naini and Sheikh Dhiya' al-Din al-Iraqi. He then returned to Samarra in 1912, to study again under his Agha Ali and Mirza Taqi. He then left Samarra for Karbala with Mirza Taqi, who was preparing for the Iraqi revolt. He remained in Karbala for a while, then returned to Najaf in 1918, resuming his classes with Sheikh al-Isfahani.

Eventually, he began teaching in his home, until his voice rendered inaudible due to the number of people present in his class, so he relocated to the al-Turuk Mosque in the al-Huwaysh area. By 1935, he was considered one of the leading scholars and teachers of Najaf.

Works

Books 

 Dar al-Salam Fi Ahkam al-Salam Fi Shari' al-Islam (Home of Peace in the Laws of Peace in Islamic Law)
 Ijtima' al-Amur wal-Nahi (Joining of Doing and Forbidding)
 Manasik al-Hajj (Hajj laws)
 Diwan (Poetry collection)
 Wasilat al-Najat (Means of Salvation)
 Thakhirat al-Ibad (The Worshippers' Provisions)

Poetry 
al-Shirazi grew up in a household that was constantly visited by grand poets like Sayyid Haidar al-Hilli and Sayyid Jafar al-Tabatabaei, who were contemporaries of his father, and so became a capable poet, writing numerous poems in praise of the Ahl al-Bayt, in Arabic and Persian.

One of his most notable poems is about Abu Talib:

Personal life 
al-Shirazi was married to Um Moosa, the daughter of his second cousin, once removed, Mirza Habiballah al-Shirazi. He had five daughters and three sons (Musa, Muhammad-Ali and Muhammad-Ibrahim). All of his sons were clerics. His son Musa died in Tehran in 1980. Muhammad-Ali died in Najaf in 2003. Muhammad-Ibrahim was abducted and executed by the Baathist regime, along with a group of scholars from Najaf and Karbala, in 1991.

He lost his eyesight in 1949 due to a disease that he attempted to treat in Tehran, but was unsuccessful.

Death 
al-Shirazi caught a fever and died on Friday, July 13, 1962, in Kufa. He was buried in the Imam Ali shrine. Ayatollah Sayyid Abu al-Qasim al-Khoei led his funeral prayers.

References

External links 

 Wasilat al-Najat [Means of Salvation] by al-Feker E-book Network

Iraqi ayatollahs
People from Shiraz
1888 births
1962 deaths
Iranian emigrants to Iraq
Shia scholars of Islam
Critics of Sunni Islam
Burials at Imam Ali Mosque
Biographical evaluation scholars
Pupils of Muhammad Kadhim Khorasani